Sathyabama Institute of Science and Technology  (SIST), formerly Sathyabama University, is a deemed to be university, situated at Chennai, Tamil Nadu, India. It was founded in 1987 as Sathyabama Engineering College by the late Jeppiaar and received its deemed to be university status in 2001.

Location
{
  "type": "FeatureCollection",
  "features": [
    {
      "type": "Feature",
      "properties": {},
      "geometry": {
        "type": "Point",
        "coordinates": [
          80.20980834960939,
          12.874396505957503
        ]
      }
    }
  ]
}The university is in Sholinganallur about 15 km from Adyar in Chennai. It has a campus of 400 acres. The university is located on Rajiv Gandhi Salai (formerly known as Old Mahabalipuram Road and popularly known as IT Corridor).

Accreditation and certification
Sathyabama Institute of Science and Technology has been accredited by the National Assessment and Accreditation Council (NAAC) with 'A' Grade.

SATHYABAMA has received ISO 9001:2008 certification.

The University is accredited by the governing body, National Buildings Organisation (NBO), Computer science engineering department latestly got the privilege of being accredited by NBO.

Rankings

The National Institutional Ranking Framework (NIRF) ranked Sathyabama Institute of Science and Technology 55st in the engineering ranking in 2021, 40th among universities and 61st overall.

Facilities

Co-Curricular Activities
Sathyabama offers visits to companies. Some of the activities like Industrial Visit, Inplant Training, Advisory Bureau for Higher Studies, Entrepreneur Development Cell, Guest Lectures, Foreign Language Classes and Sports.

Centre for nanoscience and nanotechnology
The Centre for Nanoscience and Nanotechnology was established in January 2006. The Centre was upgraded in 2011 with Advanced research Instrumentation facilities like FE-SEM, XRD, E-beam, DC thermal, RF, AFM, PLD, etc. The centre has a team of Scientists working in the area of Material Sciences, Thin Film Coatings, Nanofabrications, Environmental Nanotechnology, Concrete Research, Marine Biotechnology, Nanobiotechnology and Molecular Medicine, Nanomedical Sciences and Drug Discovery, Polymer Chemistry etc.

References

External links

Official website

Christian universities and colleges in India
Deemed universities in Tamil Nadu
Engineering colleges in Chennai
Universities in Chennai
Academic institutions formerly affiliated with the University of Madras
Educational institutions established in 1987
1987 establishments in Tamil Nadu